is a private golf course in Kawagoe, Saitama, Japan.

It opened on October 6, 1929, and was the first golf course in Saitama. It has hosted a number of professional and major amateur tournaments:

Canada Cup – 1957
Japan Open – 1933, 1956, 1995, 2006
Japan Women's Open - 1999
Japan Amateur – 1965, 1977
Japan Women's Amateur – 1956, 1964, 1974
Asian Amateur Championship – 2010

The East Course was the golf venue for the 2020 Summer Olympics.

Scorecard
East Course

West Course

Access
The nearest railway station is Kasahata Station on the Kawagoe Line.

References

External links

 

Golf clubs and courses in Japan
Sports venues in Saitama Prefecture
Venues of the 2020 Summer Olympics
Olympic golf venues
Buildings and structures in Kawagoe, Saitama
1929 establishments in Japan